There have been twenty-four United States presidential visits to Southeast Asia by ten U.S. presidents. Dwight D. Eisenhower became the first incumbent president to visit a Southeast Asian country when he visited the Philippines in 1960. Since then, every president, except John F. Kennedy and Jimmy Carter, has travelled to the region. The Philippines, a former U.S. colony (1902–1946) and a close U.S. ally, is the most visited Southeast Asian country with ten visits, followed by Indonesia with nine, and Vietnam with eight. Of the eleven sovereign states in the region, all but East Timor have been visited by a sitting American president.

Table of visits

See also 
 Foreign policy of the United States
 Foreign relations of the United States

References 

Brunei–United States relations
Cambodia–United States relations
Lists of United States presidential visits
Indonesia–United States relations
Malaysia–United States relations
Myanmar–United States relations
Philippines–United States relations
Singapore–United States relations
Thailand–United States relations
United States–Vietnam relations